Freemasons Hotel may refer to:
 Freemasons Hotel, Bridgetown
 Freemasons Hotel, Geraldton
 Freemasons Hotel (Toodyay)
 Palace Hotel, Perth – built on the site of Freemasons' Hotel in Perth
 Sail and Anchor Hotel, Fremantle – originally named Freemasons Hotel
 Royal George Hotel and Ruddle's Building, Brisbane – formerly known as Freemasons Hotel

See also
 Freemasons' Tavern, London